Fool's Errand is a fantasy novel by American writer Robin Hobb, the first in her Tawny Man Trilogy. It commences 15 years after the events in Assassin's Quest, a period covered by The Liveship Traders Trilogy (Ship of Magic, The Mad Ship, Ship of Destiny); it resumes the story of FitzChivalry Farseer after he has wandered the world and finally settled to a quiet, cottage-dwelling life with his adopted son Hap.

Plot summary

Fifteen years have passed since the end of the Red Ship War. Since then, Fitz has wandered the world accompanied only by his wolf and Wit-partner, Nighteyes, finally settling in a tiny cottage as isolated from the Farseers and Buckkeep politics as possible. He raises his adopted son, Hap, who was brought to him by Starling, whose visits are Fitz's only connection to his old life. Fitz now goes by the name "Tom Badgerlock."

Chade finds Fitz and asks him to return to Buckkeep to instruct Prince Dutiful, Kettricken's son, in the Skill, but Fitz refuses. Later, the Fool finds Fitz. The Fool hints at his adventures in the last fifteen years and reveals that he has now foreseen that he must return to Buckkeep, but Fitz declines to join. Shortly after the Fool leaves, Fitz receives an urgent summons from Chade and goes to Buckkeep. Chade reveals that Dutiful has gone missing just before his crucial diplomatic wedding to an Outislander princess. Fitz's assignment to fetch Dutiful back in time for the ceremony, while also keeping the secret that Dutiful is Witted. As Tom Badgerlock, Fitz becomes the servant of Lord Golden, the Fool's new identity at Buckkeep, to track down the Prince.

Editions

References

External links
 
 

2002 American novels
American fantasy novels
Novels by Robin Hobb
HarperCollins books